Apatelodes lescamia is a moth in the family Apatelodidae. It is found in Mexico.

References

External links
Natural History Museum Lepidoptera generic names catalog

Apatelodidae
Moths described in 1912
Taxa named by Harrison Gray Dyar Jr.